The Beach Leisure Centre is a leisure centre located in Aberdeen, Scotland. It is operated by Sport Aberdeen. It is situated adjacent to Linx Ice Arena.

History 
A leisure centre at the beach was being discussed by the council as early as 1979. The leisure centre opened in 1989. The centre was initially operated by Crossland Leisure.

The flumes have not operated since the COVID-19 pandemic due to their poor condition. In May 2022, Sport Aberdeen announced that the pool would close on 21 August after the summer school holidays as a cost saving measure due to high energy prices. It stated that the situation would be reviewed and the pool could reopen in summer 2023.

On 2 March 2023, the council announced that the leisure centre would close permenantly on 16 April 2023, along with Bucksburn Swimming Pool due to a £687,000 reduction in its yearly budget for Sport Aberdeen. The council stated that a new beachfront facility was planned.

Facilities 
The building is physically connected to the Beach Ballroom. The Beach Leisure Centre contains a swimming pool and a gym. There are three flumes:

 The Tube - a 120 metre long flume where riders sit on inflatable rafts
 Wipeout - a short, steep flume
 The Pipeline - a 95 metre long flume

Incident 
On 11 August 2011, a 12-year-old boy fractured his right ankle and shinbone after colliding with a wall at the end of the Wipeout flume. The incident occurred because there was insufficient water in the trough to slow the boy down at the end of the ride. Sport Aberdeen was fined £8,000 as a result of the incident.

References

External links 
 Official website

Sports venues in Aberdeen
1989 establishments in Scotland
Swimming venues in Scotland